Bursa Çimento is the sole cement factory in Bursa, established on 14 July 1966 as a joint stock company in Kestel, with a capital of 70,543,872 TL. The foundation of the factory was laid in 1967 with the participation of Prime Minister Süleyman Demirel and the board of directors elected in 1966. The company maintains its corporate identity with 100% publicly traded capital. The factory has an additional production facility located in Kütahya.

Board of directors involved in the establishment

References 

Economy of Bursa
Companies established in 1966
Manufacturing companies of Turkey
Companies listed on the Istanbul Stock Exchange